Marc Nieson (born in Brooklyn, New York) is an American screenwriter and professor.

Currently he teaches in Master of Fine Arts in Creative Writing Program at Chatham University in Pittsburgh, Pennsylvania.

He studied at New York University (B.F.A.) and Iowa Writers' Workshop (M.F.A.

Screenplays
 '"Bottomland'", (Feature Film) Co-Writer, Co-producer. (Winner 1992 Houston Int'l Film Fest)
 "The Dream Catcher", (Feature Film), Co-Writer. 1999. (Winner 11 Int'l Film Festivals)
 "The Speed of Life", (Feature Film), Co-Writer. (Premiere/Special Jury Prize: 2007 Venice Int'l Film Fest)

Sources
 Contemporary Authors Online. The Gale Group, 2006.

External links
 Marc Nieson faculty page

Living people
American male screenwriters
Chatham University faculty
Writers from Brooklyn
Screenwriters from New York (state)
Screenwriters from Pennsylvania
Year of birth missing (living people)